The World Breeding Federation for Sport Horses (WBFSH) connects sport horse breeding organizations with the International Federation for Equestrian Sports (FEI). The FEI is the International Olympic Committee-recognized federation for Olympic equestrian sports. The WBFSH publishes official rankings of horses competing in international sport and also ranks the breeding organizations. Since 1992, the WBFSH has held the World Breeding Championships for Sport Horses, an international-level competition between the most promising young horses in the sports of dressage, show jumping, and eventing.

Purpose and Structure
The World Breeding Federation for Sport Horses has several aims overseen by departments, which are managed by individual member studbooks. The Department Development is concerned with stimulating international-scale sport horse breeding. The Department Cooperation stimulates and coordinates cooperative actions between members, and between the WBFSH and related organizations. The Department Breeding, under the management of the National Studfarms of France, promotes several of the federation's goals for increased transparency in sport horse breeding. The Department Promotion cooperates with outside organizations to promote breeding generally, but also promotes the integration of sport and breeding activities, the organization of the World Championships for Young Horses, and advocacy of the member studbooks and breeders.

Annual meetings focus on methods of breeding sport horses, particularly regarding effective selection. Selection methods are of paramount importance, and the WBFSH and the Royal Dutch Warmblood Studbook (KWPN) in particular have encouraged a great deal of scientific research on that front.

Activities
As the link between international sport and sport horse breeders, the WBFSH advocates and mediates on both ends.

Semen standard
The WBFSH promotes the use of a semen standard as a method of protecting the interests of mare owners. This has become increasingly important as artificial insemination has become more widespread.

Unique Equine Life Number
The Unique Equine Life Number (UELN) project is also promoted by the WBFSH. Their aim is to improve data exchange between studbooks and countries. Such an improvement would result in more accurate information on which studbooks, breeders, and even sires and dams were impacting international sport.

Interstallion
The aim of Interstallion, which is run by the WBFSH, is to improve transparency and efficiency in methods of breeding sport horses. This entails, in particular, the ways in which warmblood studbooks select their breeding stock and how they calculate breeding values.

World Championships for Young Horses
The WBFSH oversees the World Championships for Young Horses, which are FEI events for rising international talent. The dressage championships, held in Verden, Germany, consist of tests for five- and six-year-old dressage horses. The jumping championships are held in Lanaken, Belgium with Zangersheide and consist of finals for five-, six-, and seven-year-old show jumping aspirants. Eventing championships take place in Le Lion-d'Angers, France, consisting of tests for six- and seven-year-old eventers.

Members
Membership in the WBFSH is open to studbooks which have the stated objective to produce sport horses in at least one Olympic discipline. Associate status is available to studbooks that produce purebred horses, or which do not meet the requirements for membership but wish to participate. Current members include studbooks of traditional warmbloods, but also less traditional studbooks such as both American Warmblood studbooks, the sport- or saddle-horse studbooks of Argentina, Brazil, and Mexico, as well as Portuguese, Dutch, and French Anglo-Arabs, Lusitanos and Andalusians.

References

External links 
 World Breeding Federation for Sport Horses - Official WBFSH website

Horse breeding organizations
International organizations based in Denmark
Sports governing bodies in Denmark